"Bloodshot" is a song by American singer Dove Cameron, released on September 27, 2019, by Disruptor and Columbia Records. The song was released alongside "Waste", as part of Cameron's debut extended play, Bloodshot / Waste.

Background and release 
Cameron hinted at releasing new music in September in an interview with E! News in August 2019. She later confirmed that she would be releasing music at the end of September on September 23, 2019, via her social media. She formally announced the release of both "Bloodshot" and "Waste" on September 25, 2019. It was released on September 27, 2019.

Cameron described the song to Billboard, saying: Bloodshot' is less specific. I am very known by my label to say 'I hate a breakup song,' which I don't anticipate changing anytime soon. To me, they're boring and they make me itchy. What I love about 'Bloodshot' is that it's not necessarily about a breakup, but it is definitely about a loss of some kind. For me, it's about loss, which I am always trying to put to lyrics."

Critical reception 
Billie Nilles from E! News complimented the song, saying "with its woozy synths and haunted vocal, that stands out as our favorite".

Music video 
The song's music video was released on October 8, 2019.

Personnel 
Credits adapted from Tidal.

 The Orphanage – production
 Carly Paige Waldrip – songwriting
 Dove Cameron – vocals, songwriting
 "Downtown" Trevor Brown – songwriting
 William Zaire Simmons – songwriting
 Melissa Hayes – assistant engineer
 Chris Gehringer – mastering
 Mike Malchicoff – mixing

Release history

References 

2019 songs
2019 singles
Columbia Records singles
Disruptor Records singles
Dove Cameron songs
Songs written by Dove Cameron
Songs written by William Zaire Simmons